Shedric Bernard Long Jr. (born August 22, 1995) is an American professional baseball second baseman who is currently a free agent. He has played in Major League Baseball (MLB) for the Seattle Mariners.

Professional career

Cincinnati Reds
Long attended Jacksonville High School in Jacksonville, Alabama. He was drafted by the Cincinnati Reds in the 12th round of the 2013 Major League Baseball Draft. He made his professional debut that year with the Arizona League Reds, batting .256 with one home run and eight RBIs in 24 games, and played 2014 with the Billings Mustangs where he batted .172 in 29 games. After starting his professional career as a catcher, Long was converted into a second baseman in 2015. He played 2015 with the Dayton Dragons where he compiled a .283 batting average with six home runs and 16 RBIs in 42 games. Long started 2016 with Dayton before being promoted to the Daytona Tortugas during the season. In 132 total games between the two teams, he slashed .293/.371/.471 with 15 home runs and 75 RBIs along with 21 stolen bases. In 2017, he played for both Daytona and the Pensacola Blue Wahoos, collecting a combined .281 batting average with 16 home runs and 50 RBIs in 104 total games between both clubs.

The Reds added Long to their 40-man roster after the 2017 season. He spent the 2018 season with Pensacola, batting .261 with 12 home runs and 56 RBIs in 126 games.

Seattle Mariners 
On January 21, 2019, the Reds traded Long and a compensation draft pick in the 2019 MLB draft to the New York Yankees for Sonny Gray and Reiver Sanmartin. The Yankees then traded Long to the Seattle Mariners for Josh Stowers.

Long began the 2019 season with the Tacoma Rainiers. On May 10, he was called up to the major league roster for the first time. He made his major league debut on May 11 versus the Boston Red Sox. In 42 games for Seattle, Long hit .263 with 5 home runs. In 2020, Long's offensive output dipped as he finished hitting only .171 with 3 home runs and 9 RBI. On September 22, 2020, Long underwent surgery on his right tibia to repair a stress fracture in his right shin, prematurely ending his 2020 season.

On April 27, 2021, Long was placed on the 60-day injured list as he continued to recover from the injury. On June 7, Long was activated off of the injured list. He hit a walk-off grand slam on June 20, 2021, in the bottom of the tenth inning that gave the Mariners a 6–2 victory against the Tampa Bay Rays. On August 2, Long was placed back on the injured list with a right shin stress reaction, and was transferred to the 60-day injured list on August 28, ending his season. On October 22, Long was outrighted off of the 40-man roster. He elected free agency on November 7.

Baltimore Orioles
On February 16, 2022, Long signed a minor league contract with the Baltimore Orioles. On August 16th, 2022, the Baltimore Orioles released Long after hitting .192 in 99 at-bats in the minor leagues.

References

External links

1995 births
Living people
African-American baseball players
Arizona League Reds players
Baseball players from Birmingham, Alabama
Billings Mustangs players
Dayton Dragons players
Daytona Tortugas players
Major League Baseball second basemen
Pensacola Blue Wahoos players
Scottsdale Scorpions players
Seattle Mariners players
Tacoma Rainiers players
21st-century African-American sportspeople
Norfolk Tides players